Craig Laurence Auckram (born 9 June 1967 in Levin) is a former New Zealand cricketer who played 20 first-class matches for Central Districts in the early 1990s. He played Hawke Cup cricket for Horowhenua, Marlborough and Manawatu, winning the Hawke Cup on two occasions. He lives in Palmerston North and works as a planning officer at the Palmerston North City Council.

References

1967 births
Living people
New Zealand cricketers
Central Districts cricketers
People from Levin, New Zealand